Irving Solomon "Irv" Teibel (October 9, 1938 – October 28, 2010) was an American field recordist, graphic designer, and photographer. His company, Syntonic Research, Inc., is best known for its influential environments psychoacoustic recording series (1969–1979) and The Altered Nixon Speech (1973). Teibel was also an accomplished photographer who worked as an editor for Ziff Davis and photographed for Popular Photography and Car and Driver.

Biography and Work
Teibel was born in Buffalo, New York in 1938. He attended the Rochester Institute of Technology and the Art Center College of Design in Pasadena, California before serving in the army as a public information specialist in Stuttgart, Germany. During this time he became interested in electronic music and musique concrète and began experimenting with tape at a local radio station. While in Germany he also claimed to have studied briefly with Karlheinz Stockhausen.

Teibel returned from Europe in 1966 and settled in New York City where he worked a number of jobs including associate editor at Ziff Davis. He also took night classes in electronic music at The New School during this time and was a founding resident of the famous Westbeth Artists Community. In 1969, he worked with Tony Conrad on Conrad's film Coming Attractions which involved recording the ocean at Coney Island. After this experience, Teibel became interested in using natural white noise for psychological purposes. Working with neuropsychologist Lou Gerstman at Bell Labs, he processed a short ocean loop recorded at Brighton Beach through an IBM 360 computer to create one continuous thirty-minute soundscape. This became the first environments recording, "The Psychologically Ultimate Seashore." The record was unique for its extremely long playback times—30 minutes per side at 33 rpm—and could be played at any speed from 16 up to 45 rpm. "The Psychologically Ultimate Seashore" was one of the first commercially available releases edited with a mainframe computer and one of the earlier examples of commercial quadraphonic sound.

In 1970, Teibel created an environmental sound installation for the Museum of Contemporary Crafts, and in 1971, he began teaching a class in experimental recording techniques at The New School.

In 1973, to demonstrate how magnetic tape could be manipulated, Teibel edited Richard Nixon’s August 15th speech to reveal that the president, in fact, had “prior knowledge” of the Watergate break-in. In the subsequent years, Teibel performed as an expert witness for magnetic tape technology.

In 1981, Teibel moved to Austin, Texas with his then-wife Rosanne. They had two daughters, Jennifer and Dara. In Austin, Teibel was involved in the local Jewish community. He lived there for 29 years until his death on October 28, 2010 at age 72.

His brother Phil was a violinist with the Buffalo Philharmonic.

Influence

Over the years, Teibel's recordings attracted significant national and international attention from publications like The New York Times. Teibel claimed environments 6 was excerpted in the “Sounds of Earth” audio collage aboard the Voyager Spacecraft’s Golden Record (this is still unverified). His work also appears in Terrence Malick’s Days of Heaven, credited as "special environmental sound recording," and Errol Morris' Gates of Heaven as "environmental sound." In 2013, his work appeared in Lise Raven's film Kinderwald.

Music critic Robert Christgau described Lou Reed's Metal Machine Music as "Lou's answer to Environments" and Lester Bangs included environments 2 on his list of the "Ten Most Ridiculous Records of the Seventies." Musicians Dominick Fernow and Mica Levi have also listed environments LPs as among their favorite recordings. Outside magazine included environments 1 on their list of "The Top 10 Field Recordings." The album cover for the drone metal group Earth's album Earth 2 is an homage to the environments 2 CD with its "special low frequency version" message.

Atlas Obscura has described Teibel as "a forgotten 1970s-era hippie polymath." They go on to explain his lasting influence: "If you flip on a waterfall to fall asleep, if you keep rainymood.com in your bookmarks, if you associate well-being with the sound of streams and crickets or wonder why the beach never quite sounds as tranquil as you imagine, it's because of Teibel."

Pitchfork elaborates on the novelty of Teibel's work: "Now, Teibel’s concept—the soothing sounds of nature, or at least a synthesized facsimile of it—is quaint, the wallpaper of therapy waiting rooms and spa foyers. At the time, it was entirely new." They go on to explain the complicated place Teibel's work inhabits in the history of field recording and music: "Here was nature not as it is, but as we hope it’ll be, the lullaby of waves without the sand in our trunks."

In February 2018, the Chicago reissue label Numero Group re-released Teibel's original recordings as an ambient sound app for iOS devices.

Discography

environments series

 environments 1 (SD 66001, 1969)
 environments 2 (SD 66002, 1970)
 environments 3 (SD 66003, 1971)
 environments 4 (SD 66004, 1974)
 environments 5 (SD 66005, 1974)
 environments 6 (SD 66006, 1974)
 environments 7 (SD 66007, 1976)
 environments 8 (SD 66008, 1974)
 environments 9 (SD 66009, 1979)
 environments 10 (SD 66010, 1979)
 environments 11 (SD 66011, 1979)

Other recordings
 The Altered Nixon Speech (SRI 7004, 1973)
 The Erickson Tapes (SD 66100, 1974) with harpsichordist Raymond Erickson

Published books
 The Complete Compendium of Universal Knowledge by William Ralston Balch (facsimile of 1895 original, Simulacrum Press, 1973)

References

External links
 Irv Teibel archive
 Irving Teibel papers, 1950–2011 Rodgers and Hammerstein Archives of Recorded Sound, New York Public Library for the Performing Arts

1938 births
2010 deaths
Ambient musicians
American audio engineers
American electronic musicians
American experimental musicians
American graphic designers
American music industry executives
American photographers
Record producers from New York (state)
20th-century American Jews
New-age musicians
Sound recordists
Wildlife sound recordists
21st-century American Jews